Robinson Army Airfield  is a military airfield at the Robinson Maneuver Training Center in Pulaski County, Arkansas, United States. The airfield is located five nautical miles (6 mi, 9 km) northwest of the central business district of Little Rock, Arkansas. It is located within the Robinson Maneuver Training Center in North Little Rock, which is home to the Arkansas National Guard.

Although most U.S. airports use the same three-letter location identifier for the FAA and IATA, this facility is assigned RBM by the FAA but has no designation from the IATA (which assigned RBM to Straubing-Wallmühle Airport in Germany).

Units 
  77th Combat Aviation Brigade
  Brigade HHC
  1st Battalion (Security & Support), 114th Aviation Regiment

Facilities 
Robinson AAF has one runway designated 4/22 with an asphalt surface measuring 5,000 by 75 feet (1,524 x 23 m).

References

External links 
 Camp Robinson / Robinson Army Airfield at GlobalSecurity.org

Airports in Arkansas
Buildings and structures in Pulaski County, Arkansas
United States Army airfields
Transportation in Pulaski County, Arkansas